Roque Ruaño Garrido, O.P. (August 16, 1877 – March 5, 1935) was a Spanish priest-civil engineer. He was known after he drew up plans for University of Santo Tomas (UST) Main Building, the first earthquake-shock resistant building in Asia, which was constructed at the Sulucan property of the Dominican order in city of Manila.

Early life
Born on August 16, 1877 in Palencia, Spain, Fr. Roque Ruaño submitted himself in faith to the Dominican Order in 1894. He first arrived in the Philippines on July 21, 1904. Upon arrival to the country, he served his first few years in the Colegio de San Juan de Letran as Father Rector. He transferred to the University of Santo Tomas and was able to obtain a Doctorate in Civil Engineering.

Significant design
Fr. Roque Ruaño practiced his Engineering expertise well. As a proof, he was the builder of the Dominican Residences in Baguio and Lingayen, Pangasinan. His most precious project and the same time UST's pride, the UST Main Building, the first earthquake-shock resistant building in the Philippines. It is with no doubt the infrastructure was well made, it has withstood the challenges of time, from the World War II, Marcos dictatorial regime to the revival of democracy and until now, history is still being made. Present studies show, the design of the Main Building is consistent with modern building code and regulation.

Life at the University of Santo Tomas
Fr. Ruaño was also a professor in the then-School of Civil Engineering of the University of Santo Tomas. The subjects he handled were mineralogy, geology, and harbors and lighthouses. He also became the Dean of the College and Regent from 1930 to 1935. He was also a representative in various international conventions in Tokyo (1926), Ravenna (1931) and London (1932).

Death and honor
The good prelate engineer died on March 1, 1935, due to heart failure. In honor of his achievements, an edifice was named after him. It was in the corner of España Boulevard and A. H. Lacson Avenue (formerly Gov. Forbes), at first it was called Architecture and Engineering Building. In its inauguration in 1950, the site was named after him, the Roque Ruaño Building which houses the students and faculty members of the Faculty of Engineering and the Institute of Information and Computing Sciences.

See also
 University of Santo Tomas (UST)
 UST Faculty of Engineering
 UST Main Building
 Civil engineering
 Order of Preachers

References

1877 births
1935 deaths
Academic staff of the University of Santo Tomas
University of Santo Tomas alumni
Spanish civil engineers